Jakeman is a surname. Notable people with the surname include:

Eric Jakeman (born 1939), British mathematical physicist 
Freddie Jakeman (1920–1986), English cricketer
George Jakeman (1903–1973), English footballer
M. Wells Jakeman (1910–1998), American archaeologist
Stuart Jakeman (1943–2013), English cricketer

See also
Lakeman